Pakistan State Oil; reporting name: PSO) is a Karachi-based Pakistani state-owned petroleum corporation involved in marketing and distribution of petroleum products. It has a network of 3,689 petroleum filling stations, out of which 3500 outlets serve the public retail sector and 189 outlets serve wholesale bulk customers. Pakistan State Oil is Pakistan's largest fuel marketing company.

History 

The creation of Pakistan State Oil (PSO) can be traced back to the year 1974, when on January 1; the government took over and merged  National Oil (PNO) and Dawood Petroleum Limited (DPL) as Premiere Oil Company Limited (POCL).

Soon after that, on 3 June 1974, Petroleum Storage Development Corporation (PSDC) came into existence. PSDC was then renamed as State Oil Company Limited (SOCL) on August 23, 1976. Following that, the Esso undertakings were purchased on 15 September 1976 and control was vested in SOCL. The end of that year (30 December 1976) saw the merger of the Premier Oil Company Limited and State Oil Company Limited, giving way to Pakistan state Oil (PSO).

After PSO's inception, the corporate culture underwent a comprehensive renewal program which was fully implemented in 2004. This program over the years included the revamping of the organizational architecture, rationalization of staff, employee empowerment and transparency in decision making through cross functional teams. This new corporate renewal program has divided the company's major operations into independent activities supported by legal, financial, informative and other services. In order to reinforce and monitor this structural change, related check and balances have been established by incorporating monitoring and control systems. Due to this effective implementation of corporate reform and consistent application of the best industrial practices and business development strategies, PSO has been able to maintain its market leadership in a highly competitive business environment. Pakistan State Oil delivers kerosene, light diesel oil and lubricants to consumers through over 500 distributors all over Pakistan.

Company overview

PSO controls a market share of over 60% of the total oil market with customer portfolio including dealers, government agencies, autonomous bodies, independent power projects and other corporate customers. It is involved in import, storage, distribution and marketing of a range of petroleum products including gasoline, diesel, fuel oil, jet fuel, LPG, CNG and petrochemicals.

It was founded on December 30, 1976, after Pakistan's government took over the management of Pakistan National Oil (PNO) and Dawood Petroleum Limited, Esso Eastern and renamed into POCL (Premier Oil Company Limited) for marketing of Petroleum Products. PSO is the first public company in Pakistan to pass the PKR 1 trillion revenue mark. Pakistan State Oil has been a member of the prestigious World Economic Forum since 2003.Its primary listing is on the Pakistan Stock Exchange.

The State-owned Pakistan State Oil Co. has 3,500 petrol pumps. Where as Cnergyico has 982 petrol pumps, Total Parco Pakistan Ltd. has 800 petrol pumps and Shell Pakistan Ltd. has 766 petrol pumps.

The PSO posted 86 billion rupees of net profit in 2021-22 financial year.However in 2020-21 PSO profit was 30 billion rupees.In the financial year ended 2021-22 thanks to all time high petroleum imports of US 19 billion dollars for Pakistan the oil giant managed to up 196% of profits from last year.

See also

List of largest companies in Pakistan

References

External links
 Pakistan State Oil official website

Automotive fuel retailers
Companies based in Karachi
Companies listed on the Pakistan Stock Exchange
National oil and gas companies
Oil and gas companies of Pakistan
Government-owned companies of Pakistan
Energy companies established in 1974
Non-renewable resource companies established in 1974
Pakistani brands